Agrionympha vari is a species of moth belonging to the family Micropterigidae. It was described by Whalley in 1978. It is found in South Africa, where it is known only from the Mariepskop in the Mpumalanga Province.

The length of the forewings is about 3.5 mm for females.

References

Endemic moths of South Africa
Micropterigidae
Moths described in 1978
Moths of Africa